Tumor lysis syndrome (TLS) is a group of metabolic abnormalities that can occur as a complication from the treatment of cancer, where large amounts of tumor cells are killed off (lysed) from the treatment, releasing their contents into the bloodstream. This occurs most commonly after the treatment of lymphomas and leukemias and in particular when treating non-Hodgkin lymphoma, acute myeloid leukemia, and acute lymphoblastic leukemia. This is a potentially fatal complication and patients at increased risk for TLS should be closely monitored while receiving chemotherapy and should receive preventive measures and treatments as necessary. TLS can also occur on its own (while not being treated with chemotherapy) although this is less common.

Tumor lysis syndrome is characterized by high blood potassium (hyperkalemia), high blood phosphate (hyperphosphatemia), low blood calcium (hypocalcemia), high blood uric acid (hyperuricemia), and higher than normal levels of blood urea nitrogen (BUN). These changes in blood electrolytes and metabolites are a result of the release of cellular contents of dying cells into the bloodstream. In this respect, TLS is analogous to rhabdomyolysis, with comparable mechanism and blood chemistry effects but with different cause. In TLS, the breakdown occurs after cytotoxic therapy or from cancers with high cell turnover and tumor proliferation rates. The metabolic abnormalities seen in tumor lysis syndrome can ultimately result in serious complications such as acute uric acid nephropathy, acute kidney failure, seizures, cardiac arrhythmias, and death.

Signs and symptoms
 Hyperkalemia. Potassium is mainly an intracellular ion. High turnover of tumor cells leads to spill of potassium into the blood. Symptoms usually do not manifest until levels are high (> 6.5 mmol/L) [normal 3.5–5.0 mmol/L] and they include
 palpitations, cardiac conduction abnormalities, and arrhythmias (can be fatal)
 muscle weakness or paralysis
 Hyperphosphatemia. Like potassium, phosphates are also predominantly intracellular. Hyperphosphatemia causes acute kidney injury in tumor lysis syndrome, because of deposition of calcium phosphate crystals in the kidney parenchyma.
 Hypocalcemia. Because of the hyperphosphatemia, calcium is precipitated to form calcium phosphate, leading to hypocalcemia. Symptoms of hypocalcemia include (but are not limited to):
 tetany
 paresthesias
 muscle cramps
 muscle weakness
 sudden changes in mental status, including emotional lability
 Parkinsonian (extrapyramidal) movement disorders
 papilledema
 Hyperuricemia and hyperuricosuria. Massive cell death and nuclear breakdown generates large quantities of nucleic acids. Of these, the purines (adenine and guanine) are converted to uric acid via the purine degradation pathway and excreted in the urine. However, at the high concentrations of uric acid generated by tumor lysis, uric acid is apt to precipitate as monosodium urate crystals.
Acute uric acid nephropathy (AUAN) due to hyperuricosuria has been a dominant cause of acute kidney failure but with the advent of effective treatments for hyperuricosuria, AUAN has become a less common cause than hyperphosphatemia. Two common conditions related to excess uric acid, gout and uric acid nephrolithiasis, are not features of tumor lysis syndrome.
 Lactic acidosis.
 Pretreatment spontaneous tumor lysis syndrome. This entity is associated with acute kidney failure due to uric acid nephropathy prior to the institution of chemotherapy and is largely associated with lymphoma and leukemia. The important distinction between this syndrome and the post-chemotherapy syndrome is that spontaneous TLS is not associated with hyperphosphatemia. One suggestion for the reason of this is that the high cell turnover rate leads to high uric acid levels through nucleobase turnover but the tumor reuses the released phosphate for growth of new tumor cells. In post-chemotherapy TLS, tumor cells are destroyed and no new tumor cells are being synthesized. TLS is most common during cytotoxic treatment of hematologic neoplasms.

Risk factors
Risk factors for tumor lysis syndrome depend on several different characteristics of the patient, the type of cancer, and the type of chemotherapy used.

Tumor characteristics: Tumors with a high cell turnover rate, rapid growth rate, and high tumor bulk tend to be more associated with the development of tumor lysis syndrome. The most common tumors associated with this syndrome are poorly differentiated lymphomas (such as Burkitt's lymphoma), other Non-Hodgkin Lymphomas (NHL), acute lymphoblastic leukemia (ALL), and acute myeloid leukemia (AML).  Other cancers (such as melanoma) have also been associated with TLS but are less common.

Patient characteristics: Certain patient-related factors can affect the development of clinical tumor lysis syndrome. These factors include elevated baseline serum creatinine, kidney failure, dehydration, and other issues affecting urinary flow or the acidity of urine.

Chemotherapy characteristics: Chemo-sensitive tumors, such as lymphomas, carry a higher risk for the development of tumor lysis syndrome. Those tumors that are more responsive to a chemotherapy agent carry a higher TLS risk. Usually, the precipitating medication regimen includes combination chemotherapy, but TLS can be triggered in cancer patients by steroid treatment alone, and sometimes without any treatment—in this case the condition is referred to as "spontaneous tumor lysis syndrome".

Diagnosis
TLS should be suspected in patients with large tumor burden who develop acute kidney failure along with hyperuricemia (> 15 mg/dL) or hyperphosphatemia (> 8 mg/dL). (Most other acute kidney failure occurs with uric acid < 12 mg/dL and phosphate < 6 mg/dL). Acute uric acid nephropathy is associated with little or no urine output. The urinalysis may show uric acid crystals or amorphous urates. The hypersecretion of uric acid can be detected with a high urine uric acid - creatinine ratio > 1.0, compared to a value of 0.6–0.7 for most other causes of acute kidney failure.

Cairo-Bishop definition

In 2004, Cairo and Bishop defined a classification system for tumor lysis syndrome.
 Laboratory tumor lysis syndrome: abnormality in two or more of the following, occurring within three days before or seven days after chemotherapy.
 uric acid > 8 mg/dL or 25% increase
 potassium > 6 meq/L or 25% increase
 phosphate > 4.5 mg/dL or 25% increase
 calcium < 7 mg/dL or 25% decrease
 Clinical tumor lysis syndrome: laboratory tumor lysis syndrome plus one or more of the following:
 increased serum creatinine (1.5 times upper limit of normal)
 cardiac arrhythmia or sudden death
 seizure

A grading scale (0–5) is used depending on the presence of lab TLS, serum creatinine, arrhythmias, or seizures.

Howard definition
In 2011, Howard proposed a refinement of the standard Cairo-Bishop definition of TLS accounting for 2 limitations:
 Two or more electrolyte laboratory abnormalities must be present simultaneously to be considered related to TLS. In fact, some patients may present with one abnormality, but later another one may develop that is unrelated to the TLS (e.g., hypocalcemia associated with sepsis).
 A 25% change from baseline should not be considered a criterion since such increases are rarely clinically important unless the value is already outside the normal range.

Moreover, any symptomatic hypocalcemia should constitute clinical TLS.

Prevention
It is important to prevent life-threatening manifestations associated with TLS which include acute kidney injury, hyperkalemia (which may cause cardiac arrhythmias), and or hypocalcemia (which may cause cardiac arrhythmias and neuromuscular irritability).

Acute kidney injury: Patients at risk for developing TLS (e.g. patients about to receive chemotherapy for a cancer with a high cell turnover rate, especially lymphomas and leukemias) should receive appropriate intravenous hydration in order to improve blood flow to the kidneys, maximize urine output, and ultimately prevent precipitation of uric acid crystals that can led to acute kidney injury. A diuretic may also be indicated to further increase urine output in addition to intravenous hydration. Another approach to prevent damage to the kidneys is to prevent the build up of uric acid during TLS, and this can be accomplished with use of allopurinol or rasburicase. Allopurinol (a xanthine oxidase inhibitor, which inhibits uric acid production) works by preventing the formation of uric acid following tumor cell lysis. Rasburicase is a synthetic urate oxidase enzyme and acts by degrading uric acid. It is not recommended to alkalinize urine in the management of TLS.

Hyperkalemia: Monitoring potassium levels in the blood frequently and cardiac monitoring (given the risk of cardiac arrhythmias) are important components in the prevention of adverse consequences in TLS. Other strategies include limiting oral intake of potassium and excreting potassium through the gastrointestinal tract using agents such as oral sodium polystyrene sulfonate can be beneficial. Insulin therapy (in conjunction with glucose administration) as well as beta-receptor agonists (such as albuterol) can also be used but are temporary interventions and potassium is not excreted from the body. Hemodialysis and hemofiltration can also be used as options to remove potassium from the bloodstream when hyperkalemia is present.

Hypocalcemia: Hyperphosphatemia is a common finding in TLS and high phosphorus levels can itself contribute to hypocalcemia and therefore phosphate binders may be beneficial in preventing this form of hypocalcemia.

Treatment

Treatment is first targeted at the specific metabolic disorder.

In general, rasburicase and hydration are the mainstays of treatment in patients with clinical evidence of tumor lysis syndrome. A loop diuretic may also be indicated to maintain appropriate production of urine by the kidneys. Further treatment is targeted towards the specific metabolic abnormalities present in patients with TLS (see "main articles" linked above). Mild hyperkalemia without symptoms can be treated with a loop diuretic and sodium polystirene, while a temporizing agent such as rapid acting insulin (in conjunction with glucose) and an agent to stabilize cardiac membranes such as calcium carbonate may be given in cases of severe hyperkalemia. Concerning symptoms related to hypocalcemia (e.g. seizures) in TLS patients can be treated with calcium gluconate. Tumor lysis patients may ultimately also require renal replacement therapy such as through hemodialysis if indicated.

Prognosis
The rate of mortality from tumor lysis syndrome may vary widely depending on the type of underlying malignancy. However, the occurrence of acute kidney injury is concerning given the high mortality that is generally associated with it.

References

External links 

Oncology
Blood disorders
Conditions of the subcutaneous fat
Oncological emergencies
Syndromes